Chavagnes (also called Chavagnes-les-Eaux) is a former commune in the Maine-et-Loire department of western France. On 1 January 2017, it was merged into the new Terranjou commune.

See also
Communes of the Maine-et-Loire department
Chavagnes-en-Paillers, Vendée department
Chavagnes-les-Redoux, Vendée department
Chavagnes International College situated in Chavagnes-en-Paillers.

References

Former communes of Maine-et-Loire